The 1999 New Zealand bravery awards were announced via a special honours list on 23 October 1999. The awards recognised 30 people, including six posthumously, for acts of bravery between 1989 and 1998.

New Zealand Cross (NZC)
 Jacinda Margaret Amey – of Tuatapere.

 Reginald John Dixon – of Palmerston North. Posthumous award.

New Zealand Bravery Star (NZBS)
 Robert Edwin (Rob) Hall  – of Christchurch. Posthumous award.

 Andrew Michael Harris – of New Plymouth. Posthumous award.

 Walter Bruce Butler  – of Napier.

New Zealand Bravery Decoration (NZBD)
 Terence Albert Hood.

 Allan Donald Cantley – of Morrinsville; sergeant, New Zealand Police.

 Christopher Michael Crean – of New Plymouth. Posthumous award.

 Graeme James Hunt – of Hastings.

 Warren Gilbert Sloss – of Wanganui; constable, New Zealand Police.

 Hakihana Jackson Pomare – of Matauri Bay. Posthumous award.

New Zealand Bravery Medal (NZBM)
 Private Brendon Drew Burchell – of Auckland; Royal New Zealand Infantry Regiment (Retired).
 Private David Edward Whawhai Stewart – of Whakatāne; Royal New Zealand Infantry Regiment. Posthumous award.
 Private Sonny Wayne Terure – of Auckland; Royal New Zealand Infantry Regiment (Retired).

 Keith Desmond Troon – of Rangiora.
 Ross William McEwan – of Kaiapoi.

 Anne Michele Francis (formerly Holdsworth) – of Rotorua.

 Tracey Lee-Anne Chapman – of Timaru.
 Karen Ruth Foster – of Timaru.
 Jan Yvonne McCrea – of Ashburton.

 William John Funnell  – of Taupō.

 Stephen Robert Gibb – of Nelson.

 Driver Mark Mattie Povey – of Helensville; Royal New Zealand Corps of Transport (Retired).

 Dean William Pleydell – of Taupō; constable (now senior constable), New Zealand Police.
 Patrick Anthony Rice – of Auckland; constable, New Zealand Police.

 Flight Sergeant Helicopter Crewman Michael James Cannon – of Auckland; Royal New Zealand Air Force.
 Sergeant Helicopter Crewman Lisa Kay Franken (née De Waal) – of Melbourne; Royal New Zealand Air Force.

 Peter Robert Broughton – of Palmerston North; senior constable, New Zealand Police.
 Floyd Steven Pratt – Te Puke; constable, New Zealand Police.

 John Joseph McNamee – of Perth.

References

Bravery
Bravery awards
New Zealand bravery awards